The Portuguese Synagogue, also known as the Esnoga, or  Snoge, is a late 17th-century Sephardic synagogue in Amsterdam, completed in 1675. Esnoga is the word for synagogue in Judaeo-Spanish, the traditional Judaeo-Spanish language of Sephardi Jews.

The Amsterdam Sephardic community was one of the largest and richest Jewish communities in Europe during the Dutch Golden Age, and their very large synagogue reflected this.  The synagogue remains an active place of worship and is also a popular tourist attraction.

Background

The Sephardim (Hebrew for "Jews of the Iberian Peninsula") were issued with the Spanish royal Alhambra Decree in 1492, whereby they were given the choice of exile from Spain, or conversion to Catholicism, or failing to do either, execution. Of Spain's estimated 200,000 Jews at that time, around half converted; many by coercion, others because of social and financial pressures preventing their departure, and a few out of genuine religious conviction. They became Spain's Jewish-origin New Christians or conversos (i.e. "converts" to Catholicism).

Of the other half of Spain's Jews who did not convert, and instead chose exile, some sailed south (becoming the North African Sephardim), others went east (becoming the Eastern Sephardim), but most crossed the border west to Portugal.

In Portugal, Jewish life was interrupted only a few years later, when there too they were issued with the Portuguese decree against the Jews in 1496. While in theory, the Jews now in Portugal who chose not convert to Catholicism also had the option to be expelled (or executed) by 1497, the Portuguese king, not wanting a similar Jewish flight and brain drain as happened in Spain, in practice blocked Portugal's ports of exit, and subsequently reasoned that those who stayed behind agreed to become Christians by default. Thus the Jews in Portugal were forced to convert to Catholicism in 1496 after the decree and, all but a few who did manage to flee, became Portugal's Jewish-origin New Christians or conversos.

For the next few centuries, the Inquisition in Spain and Portugal continued to investigate the conversos and their descendants on suspicions that they continued to practice Judaism in secret.  Many in fact did continue to practice Judaism behind closed doors, while publicly professing to be Catholics; in Spanish and Portuguese these were called Marranos.

The persecutions and trials by the inquisition against conversos lasted well into the late 1800s. Furthermore, the legal distinction between so-called Old Christians and New Christians was maintained for centuries, with a person's pedigree always on record.

Both those who actively maintained Jewish practices in secret, and also some sincere conversos who had converted fully to Catholicism, were at times hounded, persecuted and executed on charges of being Marranos.  This was often a pretext for the confiscation of their property.  Many of them wished to have freedom of religion again and to be free from this institutionalized antisemitism. Amsterdam, then one of the greatest cities in the world, offered both of these things.

In this historical context, a substantial migration of conversos from the Iberian Peninsula to Amsterdam took place from the 1600s to the early 1800s.  Once in Amsterdam, many returned to Judaism openly and publicly. They called themselves Portuguese Jews, even those who came directly from Spain. They wanted to avoid being identified with Spain, which was at war with the Dutch Republic at the time during the Eighty Years' War. This branch of Judaism is also known as the Western Sephardim.

The Sephardic Jews in Amsterdam were known as the "first modern Jews" because they were the first to distinguish between religious and secular spheres of their individual and collective lives. Their religious life was focused primarily on the synagogue, the religious calendar of Jewish life, and an eagerness to provide a Jewish education for their children.

During the Holocaust, the facility was slated to become a deportation center for Jews, but Leo Palache and a team of volunteers managed to dissuade the Nazis from this plan. Instead, the building concealed Jewish ritual items for deported Jews in the sanctuary ceiling and attic floor.

The World War II diary of executive director Salomon Coutinho was discovered in Amsterdam and details the synagogues works and efforts to protect the building during the War.

Construction and building

On December 12, 1670, the Sephardic Jewish community of Amsterdam acquired the site to build a synagogue and construction work began on April 17, 1671, under the architect . On August 2, 1675, the Esnoga was finished. The design is based on the plans for King Solomon's temple.

The inscription above the entrance is from Psalm 5:8: "In the abundance of Thy loving kindness will I come into Thy house". The sign also contains "1672", the year the building was intended to be completed, and "Aboab", the name of the chief rabbi who initiated the construction project.

The building is free-standing and rests on wooden piles; the foundation vaults can be viewed by boat from the canal water underneath the synagogue. The entrance to the main synagogue is off a small courtyard enclosed by low buildings housing the winter synagogue, offices and archives, homes of various officials, the rabbinate, a mortuary, and noted Etz Hayim library.  The interior of the synagogue is a single, very high rectangular space retaining its original wooden benches. The floor was covered with fine sand, in the old Dutch tradition, to absorb dust, moisture and dirt from shoes and to muffle the noise. Only five synagogues in the world had a sand floor, and this was the only one with such a floor surviving outside the Caribbean.

During the 1955–1959 renovation, the former Etz Hayim seminary auditorium was redesigned as a winter synagogue;  central heating and electric lighting were added. The benches were taken from a synagogue originally built in 1639 and the Torah ark dates from 1744. The ark is made from a solid piece of jacaranda wood from Brazil and the main sanctuary does not have any internal electric system; two chandeliers that hold 1000 candles are lit when necessary.

Controversies within the community 
In November 2021 Yitzhak Melamed, professor of philosophy at Johns Hopkins University and the Hebrew University of Jerusalem and a world renowned expert on Baruch Spinoza, requested to visit the synagogue to film Melamed conducting research in the library’s archives.

Serfaty banned Melamed from visiting the community’s synagogue and library due to his research of the “heretic.” Responding to the professor in a letter, Serfaty not only forbade Melamed to film in the building but declared the professor a person non-grata, essentially even denying Melamed to participate in prayer services in the Esnoga.

"The chachamim and parnassim of Kahal Kados Torah excommunicated Spinoza and his writings with the severest possible ban, a ban that remains in force and cannot be rescinded. You have devoted your life to the study of Spinoza’s banned works and the development of his ideas,” Serfaty writes.

"Your request to visit our complex and create a film about this Epicouros [heretic]… is incompatible with our centuries-old halachic, historic and ethical tradition and an unacceptable assault on our identity and heritage,” Serfaty adds.

Serfaty concludes the letter by barring Melamed entirely from the Esnoga synagogue. “I therefore deny your request and declare you persona non grata in the Portuguese Synagogue complex,” he writes.

Pinchas Toledano, the Hakham-Emeritus (Chief Rabbi-Emeritus) of the Esnoga and the former Chief Rabbi of the Beth Din in The Netherlands stands behind Serfaty. In a letter to Melamed, Toledano writes: "I hereby inform you that ten professors from all over the world, including Israel, came to a symposium on December 6, 2015. The Spinoza case has been widely discussed. Myself, as the Chacham of the congregation, gave a lecture on the subject and the conclusion was that the cherem (ban, ed.) imposed on him by our previous rabbis must be maintained. In light of the above, there is no opportunity to discuss Spinoza with you in our complex.”

On November 30, 2021 the board of the Esnoga, sent a letter to its members. In the letter, they stated that both Serfaty and Toledano don't agree to retract their words. However, the board didn't fire them. 

On December 2 the board of the Esnoga sent a second letter to its members, with attached a letter to Melamed with an invitation to do research and film in the Esnoga complex.

Ets Haim Library 
The Portuguese Synagogue has one of the oldest Jewish libraries in the world, filled with original and rare texts and constantly called upon for academic and rabbinical research. It was founded in 1616 and has been housed in the historical complex of the Portuguese Jewish community of Amsterdam since 1675. In 1889 the private library of the then librarian David Montezinos was donated to Ets Haim and the library is known since then as Ets Haim/Livraria Montezinos. In the 1940s, the library's contents were shipped to Germany by the Nazis and the books were returned to the Netherlands after the war; the books were sent to Israel in 1979 and returned to Amsterdam in 2000. In 2014, in partnership with the National Library of Israel, a majority of the manuscripts were digitized, making the catalog available online and free.

Interior 
The interior of the Portuguese Synagogue is of the longitudinal Iberian-Sephardic type. The Holy Ark is situated in the South East Corner of the building and faces Jerusalem. On the other side of the room, opposite of the ark, is a tebah.

The Women's Gallery is supported by twelve stone columns, each which represents one of the Twelve Tribes of Israel. In addition to these columns, there are four large brass chandeliers that hold a total of a thousand candles. All of the candles are lit in the synagogue during worship services. The light of these candles shine together through the 72 windows that exist in the building.

Around the building, there are numerous offices, archives, the rabbinate, the mortuary, and the Ets Haim. The Ets Haim (Tree of Life) is the library that contains valuable collections of Sephardic manuscripts.

Image gallery

See also
Curaçao synagogue
History of the Jews in the Netherlands
Jekuthiel Sofer, an 18th-century scribe at the Esnoga.
Joods Historisch Museum, a Jewish historical museum occupying four former synagogues adjacent to the Esnoga
Sephardic Jews in the Netherlands
Spanish and Portuguese Jews
Tzedek ve-Shalom, Sephardic synagogue in Suriname built by a community that fled the Inquisition

References

External links
 
 
 Archive of the Portuguese-Israelite community in Amsterdam, in the Archives Database of the Amsterdam City Archives
 Consecration of the new Portuguese synagogue August 2, 1675. Bibliotheca Rosenthaliana
 Website of Ets Haim, Sephardi library
 UNESCO listing in the World memory
 

17th-century synagogues
Jewish Dutch history
Orthodox Judaism in the Netherlands
Orthodox synagogues
Religious buildings and structures completed in 1675
Rijksmonuments in Amsterdam
Sephardi Jewish culture in the Netherlands
Sephardi synagogues
Synagogues in the Netherlands
Judaism in Amsterdam
Portuguese-Jewish diaspora in Europe
Spanish-Jewish diaspora in Europe
1675 establishments in the Dutch Republic
Religion in the Dutch Republic